Mariana Cordero is a Spanish actress. She appeared in more than thirty films since 1999, as well as acting in TV series. She has a daughter, Lara Grube, who is also an actress.

Selected filmography

References

External links
 

Living people
Spanish film actresses
Spanish television actresses
Year of birth missing (living people)
Place of birth missing (living people)